Toltecaria is a monotypic genus of Mexican sheet weavers containing the single species, Toltecaria antricola. It was first described by J. A. Miller in 2007, and is only found in Mexico.

See also
 List of Linyphiidae species (Q–Z)

References

Linyphiidae
Monotypic Araneomorphae genera
Spiders of Mexico